The Middlebrook Schools are a pair of historic public school buildings located at Middlebrook, Augusta County, Virginia. The original school building was built in 1916 and expanded in 1919.  A separate high school was built adjacent to it in 1922–1923, and an agriculture shop building was added in the 1930s.  The original school is an "L"-shaped, two-story  building consisting of two front rooms and a south ell room, with a one-room plan, two-story addition creating a square plan.  It has a hipped roof and vernacular Colonial Revival style entrance.  The interior also reflects the Colonial Revival style. The school closed in 1967.

Both buildings were listed on the National Register of Historic Places in 1985.

References

School buildings on the National Register of Historic Places in Virginia
Colonial Revival architecture in Virginia
School buildings completed in 1916
1916 establishments in Virginia
Schools in Augusta County, Virginia
National Register of Historic Places in Augusta County, Virginia